Fritzi Jokl (23 March 1895 – 15 October 1974) was an Austro-American operatic soprano.

Life 
Born in Vienna, Jokl's vocal training took place with the wife of the piano virtuoso Moriz Rosenthal, Mrs. Rosenthal-Ranner, among others. She received her first engagement in 1917 at the Oper Frankfurt. She stayed there until 1922 and sang many coloratura parts. Afterwards Jokl changed for one season to the Landestheater Darmstadt (today Staatstheater Darmstadt), in order to finally sing under the conductor Eugen Szenkar at first at the Theater des Westens  (until 1925), then at the Cologne Opera (until 1926) to sing. The success there brought her an engagement at the Salzburg Festival (1928) she was Despina), a guest engagement at the Covent Garden Opera in London and finally a firm contract as first coloratura soprano at the Bavarian State Opera. Also guest appearances at the Vienna State Opera (1930) and in Amsterdam (1932) prove their prominent position. A planned move to the Kroll Opera House in Berlin in 1932 did not come about because of its closure, so she returned to the Landestheater Darmstadt, where she was dismissed as a Jew after the seizure of power by the National Socialists in spring 1933.

She still made some appearances at events of the Jüdischer Kulturbund under the conductors Joseph Rosenstock and Hans Wilhelm Steinberg  and a tour of France with a travelling stage. Then Jokl had to emigrate to the USA via Austria in 1936.

The Metropolitan Opera in New York turned down an engagement for the singer because her part was already occupied by Lily Pons and Bidu Sayão. Jokl subsequently ended her career and only performed in private. She settled in New York and married the author and journalist Jack Siegel.

In Darmstadt, a plaque was erected in the foyer of the Staatstheater in June 2011 in memory of the displaced Jewish employees of the Institute, including Jokl.

Jokl died in New York City at age 79.

Roles 
Oper Frankfurt

 Rosina in Barbier von Sevilla
 Urbain in Les Huguenots
 Oscar in Un ballo in maschera
 Blondchen in Die Entführung aus dem Serail
 Sophie in Der Rosenkavalier

Berliner Volksoper

 Konstanze in Die Entführung aus dem Serail
 Norina in Don Pasquale
 Violetta in La Traviata

Staatsoper München

 Zerbinetta in Ariadne auf Naxos (under the direction of the composer Richard Strauss)
 Gilda in Rigoletto
 Nedda in Der Bajazzo
 Olympia in The Tales of Hoffmann
 Marzelline in The Marriage of Figaro
 Rosalinde in Die Fledermaus

Covent Garden Opera

 Najade and Zerbinetta in Ariadne auf Naxos
 Waldvogel in Siegfried

Salzburger Festspiele 1928

 Despina in Così fan tutte

Berliner Kulturbund

 Susanna in Figaro
 Olympia in The Tales of Hoffmann
 Micaela in Carmen

Other roles

 Königin der Nacht in The Magic Flute
 Susanna in The marriage of Figaro
 Cenerentola in Aschenbrödel oder der Triumph der Güte
 Galathea in the opera of the same name
 Inez in L'Africaine
 Le Rossignol in the opera of the same name

Discography 
 Lebendige Vergangenheit – Fritzi Jokl. Preiser/Naxos, Vienna 1999
 Fritzi Jokl Heritáge 1924–1928. Dante Musikwelt-Tonträger 1998
 Four Famous Sopranos of the Past (Schöne, Jokl, Eisinger and Szabo). Preiser/Naxos, Vienna 1998
 Aus Münchens Operngeschichte, darin: Fritzi Jokl singt Don Pasquale: Auch ich versteh’ die feine Kunst. Preiser/Naxos, Vienna 1999
 ABC der Gesangskunst, Teil 6, Fritzi Jokl singt: Alessandro Stradella: Seid meiner Wonne stille Zeugen und Die Hugenotten: Nobles Seigneurs salut (Ihr edlen Herr’n allhier). Cantus-Line (DA Music), Diepholz 2002

Further reading 
 Karl-Josef Kutsch, Leo Riemens:

External links

References 

Austrian operatic sopranos
20th-century Austrian women opera singers
Jewish opera singers
Jewish emigrants from Austria to the United States after the Anschluss
1895 births
1974 deaths
Musicians from Vienna